Spence is a masculine given name or nickname, often a short form of Spencer.

It may refer to:

 Spence M. Armstrong (born 1934), retired United States Air Force lieutenant general and test pilot
 Spence Broughton (c. 1746–1792), English highwayman
 Spence Caldwell (1909–1983), Canadian broadcasting pioneer
 Spence Moore II, American actor
 Spence Powell (1903–1970), Australian politician
 Spencer Tracy (1900–1967), American actor

English-language masculine given names
Hypocorisms